Gandhari Amman Kovil is a Hindu temple located at Mele Thampanoor, Thiruvananthapuram, Kerala, India. Gandhari amman is the principal deity in this temple. There are other small temples of Ganesha, Nagaraj and Manthramurthi are located in this temple complex. Chithra poornima is the main festival in this temple. This festival is celebrated in the month of May.

This kovil is located 1.5 km from Thiruvananthapuram central Railway Station, Thampanoor.

References

Hindu temples in Thiruvananthapuram district